Joseph Speake (born 8 January 1944) is a British sprinter. He competed in the men's 4 × 100 metres relay at the 1968 Summer Olympics.

References

1944 births
Living people
Athletes (track and field) at the 1968 Summer Olympics
British male sprinters
Olympic athletes of Great Britain
Place of birth missing (living people)